Texas Tower 1 was a planned Texas Tower that was to be located on Cashes Ledge,  off the coast  of New Hampshire in  of water. The 4604th Support Group, Otis Air Force Base, Massachusetts was supported by nearby Pease Air Force Base. The United States Air Force approved the construction of Tower #1 on January 11, 1954, but the tower was never completed because of improvements to radar over the area.

References

External links

Military installations in New Hampshire
Proposed installations of the United States Air Force